Don Marino Barreto Jr. (8 December 1925 – 10 December 1971) was an Italian pop singer and musician.

Career 
Born Marino Barreto y Rubio in Matanzas, Barreto moved to Italy in 1949, beginning his career as a contrabassist. His main success was the song "Arrivederci", which peaked the Italian hit parade in 1959 and won a Gold Record. Other Top 5 hits include the songs "Telefonami", "Visino d'angelo", "È vero", "Non lasciarmi".
His success declined in the early 1960s, nonetheless Barreto continued his activity performing live until his death for cirrhosis on 8 December 1971 in Milan, two days after his 46th birthday.

He is sometimes confused with his half-brother, Don Marino Barreto (1907–1995), who had a singing career in Britain.

References

External links

 
 

1925 births
1971 deaths
People from Matanzas
Italian pop singers
Italian bass guitarists
Cuban emigrants to Italy
Deaths from cirrhosis
20th-century Italian  male singers
20th-century Cuban male singers